Reilley Rankin (born April 17, 1979) is an American professional golfer, currently playing on the LPGA Tour.

Amateur career
Rankin was a three-time American Junior Golf Association (AJGA) Rolex All-American from 1995 to 1997. She was a three-time All-American at the University of Georgia where she was the Southeastern Conference (SEC) Freshman of the Year in 1997, the NCAA Freshman of the Year in 1998, and the 1997–98 SEC Player of the Year. She won four consecutive collegiate tournaments in 1998, the same year she was a semifinalist at the Women's Western Amateur. She was forced to take two years off from competition in 1999 and 2000 after breaking her back but came in 2001 to lead the Georgia to the NCAA Championship title. She graduated from Georgia in 2001 with a degree in Child and Family Development.

Professional career
Rankin turned professional in July 2001, playing on the Futures Tour. She played two tournaments on the Futures Tour in 2001, and then played a full season in 2002 and 2003. In 2003, she won two events which earned fifth place on the Futures Tour money list and full membership on the LPGA Tour for the 2004 season. Her best finish to date on the LPGA Tour is a tie for second at the 2007 Mizuno Classic. In 2010, she fell to 139th on the final official LPGA money list, requiring her to return to LPGA qualifying school in order to retain her LPGA playing privileges for 2011. She finished in the top 10 at the qualifying tournament.

Personal life
On June 4, 1998, during the summer between her sophomore and junior years at the University of Georgia, Rankin was severely injured after jumping from a cliff into a lake about 70 feet below. Her injuries included a broken back, a broken sternum and bruised heart, lungs and aorta. She was confined to a body cast for three months.

Professional wins (2)

Futures Tour wins (2)

References

External links

Profile on Yahoo! sports 

American female golfers
Georgia Bulldogs women's golfers
LPGA Tour golfers
Golfers from South Carolina
Sportspeople from Beaufort, South Carolina
People from Hilton Head, South Carolina
1979 births
Living people